A statue of long-time Boston Celtics coach Red Auerbach by Lloyd Lillie (sometimes called Arnold "Red" Auerbach or Red Auerbach) is installed outside Quincy Market at Faneuil Hall, in Boston, Massachusetts, United States.

Description
The bronze sculpture measures approximately 5 ft. x 6 ft. x 2 ft. 3 in. It depicts Auerbach sitting on a bench and holding a cigar.

History
The statue was designed in 1985, and dedicated on September 20 of that year. It was surveyed by the Smithsonian Institution's "Save Outdoor Sculpture!" program in 1993.

See also

 1985 in art

References

External links
 Red Auerbach, (sculpture) – Boston, Massachusetts

1985 establishments in Massachusetts
1985 sculptures
Bronze sculptures in Massachusetts
Government Center, Boston
Monuments and memorials in Boston
Outdoor sculptures in Boston
Sculptures of men in Massachusetts
Statues in Boston